Stjepan Skočibušić (born 10 June 1979) is a Croatian retired football defender. He spent eight years of his professional career playing in Croatia’s Prva HNL, collecting 145 appearances. He spent  four years of his career in Belgium and Russia, playing for Mouscron and Torpedo Moscow. He retired from professional football in 2011, after playing with Zadar.

Honours
Hajduk Split
Prva HNL: 2003-04

References

External links
 

1979 births
Living people
Sportspeople from Makarska
Association football defenders
Croatian footballers
HNK Rijeka players
HNK Hajduk Split players
Royal Excel Mouscron players
FC Torpedo Moscow players
NK Zadar players
Croatian Football League players
Belgian Pro League players
Russian Premier League players
Croatian expatriate footballers
Expatriate footballers in Belgium
Croatian expatriate sportspeople in Belgium
Expatriate footballers in Russia
Croatian expatriate sportspeople in Russia